Ram Island is a small mudstone and dolerite island, with an area of 1 ha, in south-eastern Australia.  It is part of Tasmania’s Vansittart Island Group, lying in eastern Bass Strait between Flinders and Cape Barren Islands in the Furneaux Group.  It is privately owned.

Wildlife
BirdLife International identifies Ram Island as part of the Franklin Sound Islands Important Bird Area because it holds over 1% of the world populations of six bird species.

Flora and fauna
Recorded breeding seabird, waterbird and wader species are little penguin, Pacific gull, sooty oystercatcher, white-faced storm-petrel, black-faced cormorant, Caspian tern and Cape Barren goose.

References

Furneaux Group
Important Bird Areas of Tasmania
Private islands of Tasmania